Pulis is a surname. Notable people with the name include:

Adrian Pulis (born 1979), Maltese football player
Anthony Pulis (born 1984), English-born Welsh football player and coach
Ray Pulis (born 1964), former football player
Tony Pulis (born 1958), Welsh football manager and former player

See also
Puli, breed of dog
Puls (disambiguation)